Asiana may refer to:

 Kumho Asiana Group, a South Korean conglomerate whose subsidiaries include the following notable companies also with the name Asiana:
Asiana Airlines, one of South Korea's two major airlines
Asiana IDT, an information technology service provider
 Asia (Roman province), a late Roman Republic province also known as Asiana